Rubén L. F. Hábito (born c. 1947) is a Filipino Zen rōshi of the Sanbō Kyōdan lineage.

Biography
Hábito started out as a Jesuit priest doing missionary work in Japan. There, he began practising under Yamada Kōun, a Zen rōshi who taught Christian students, which was unusual for the time. In 1988, Hábito received dharma transmission from Yamada. Ruben subsequently left the Jesuit order in 1989, and in 1991 founded the Maria Kannon Zen Center, a lay organization in Dallas, Texas.

Hábito has been a faculty member of the Perkins School of Theology at the Southern Methodist University since 1989. He is married and has two sons.

Bibliography

See also
Timeline of Zen Buddhism in the United States

External links
Ruben Habito Interview
Rubin Habito's 2017 Dharma Talk for Tricycle: The Buddhist Review, We Are All Refugees: Seeking Our True Home

1947 births
Former Jesuits
Laicized Roman Catholic priests
Filipino Buddhists
Filipino Zen Buddhists
Filipino former Christians
Sanbo Kyodan Buddhists
Rōshi
Converts to Buddhism from Roman Catholicism
Filipino expatriates in the United States
Southern Methodist University faculty
Zen Buddhism writers
Living people